Laconia Municipal Airport  is a general aviation airport located three miles (5 km) northeast of the central business district (CBD) of Laconia, a city in Belknap County, New Hampshire, USA. It is included in the Federal Aviation Administration (FAA) National Plan of Integrated Airport Systems for 2017–2021, in which it is categorized as a regional general aviation facility.

Though it no longer supports a passenger airline, Laconia was once served by Northeast Express Regional Airlines.  Northeast Express utilized an EAS (Essential Air Service) subsidy.  Airline service was later provided by Skymaster Airlines, owned by Luke Smith.  Smith transformed the service from piston prop Cessna 421-type planes to 15-passenger turbine Beech 99s.  Skymaster expanded service from two cities (Laconia and Boston) to five, adding Keene, New Hampshire, Rutland, Vermont, and Newark, New Jersey.  Skymaster was sold to three individuals who formed Atlantic North Airlines.

Laconia airport sees frequent private jet travel, mainly because of its proximity to the wealthy Lake Winnipesaukee region, the Meadowbrook (Bank of New Hampshire) Pavilion, and New Hampshire Motor Speedway. KLCI has two primary fixed base operators (FBOs), Emerson Aviation and Sky Bright.

References

External links 

Airports in New Hampshire
Buildings and structures in Laconia, New Hampshire
Transportation buildings and structures in Belknap County, New Hampshire
Former Essential Air Service airports